Rebecca Spence (born 19 September 1988) is a New Zealand triathlete who represented her country at the 2018 Commonwealth Games on the Gold Coast, finishing in tenth place in the women's triathlon.

References

1988 births
Living people
Sportspeople from Auckland
New Zealand female triathletes
Triathletes at the 2018 Commonwealth Games
Commonwealth Games competitors for New Zealand
20th-century New Zealand women
21st-century New Zealand women